Pseudofavolus is a genus of fungi in the family Polyporaceae. The genus was circumscribed by French mycologist Narcisse Théophile Patouillard in 1900. The generic name combines the Ancient Greek word  ("false") with the genus name Favolus.

Species
Pseudofavolus bipindiensis (Henn.) Pat. (1914)
Pseudofavolus miquelii  (Mont.) Pat. (1900) – Dominican Republic; Sierra Leone
Pseudofavolus nigrus  Ryvarden (1987)
Pseudofavolus orinocensis  (Pat. & Gaillard) Ryvarden (1972)
Pseudofavolus polygrammus  (Mont.) G.Cunn. (1965)
Pseudofavolus pulchellus  (Lév.) G.Cunn. (1965) – Philippines

References

Polyporaceae
Polyporales genera
Taxa described in 1900
Taxa named by Narcisse Théophile Patouillard